The Sikorsky RS was a designation used by the United States Navy for a number of different Sikorsky twin-engined amphibious flying boats.

Variants
RS-1
Designation for three Sikorsky S-41 flying boats for evaluation.
XRS-2
Designation for two Sikorsky PS-2 flying boats converted as transports.
RS-3
Four Sikorsky PS-3 flying boats converted as transports.
RS-4
Designation for two impressed Sikorsky S-40A flying boats.
RS-5
Designation for two impressed Sikorsky S-41 flying boats.

See also

References

Notes

Bibliography
 

RS
1920s United States military transport aircraft
Flying boats
Amphibious aircraft
Sesquiplanes
Twin piston-engined tractor aircraft